Sidney Murray Hurst  (12 August 1918 – 21 July 2016) was a New Zealand farmer and a pioneer of irrigation in North Otago. A member of the Lincoln College Council for 23 years, including six years as its chair, he advocated for the independence of the institution from the University of Canterbury.

Biography
Born in Oamaru on 12 August 1918, Hurst was the son Archibald Campbell Hurst and Jessie McKenzie Murray. He was educated at Waitaki Boys' High School. He married Hazel Irene Ludemann in 1941, and the couple went on to have five children.

During World War II, Hurst served as a flight sergeant with the Royal New Zealand Air Force. He became a farmer and was involved in farming sheep, deer, cattle and dairy cows, as well as orcharding, farm forestry and beekeeping. He was a founding director of the meat exporting company Fortex and a life member of Federated Farmers.

Hurst was particularly associated with the development of irrigation in the Lower Waitaki basin from the 1960s. He was a leader of the Lower Waitaki irrigation scheme, which began operating in 1968, and later was a member of the board of the National Water and Soil Council.

Hurst served as a member of the Lincoln College Council between 1962 and 1985, the last six years of which as chairman. He was in the vanguard of those who advocated for the autonomy of Lincoln as a university of its own right, separate from its parent institution, the University of Canterbury.

Hurst died in Oamaru on 21 July 2016.

Honours and awards
In the 1989 New Year Honours, Hurst was appointed an Officer of the Order of the British Empire, for services to agriculture and education. In 1990, he was awarded the New Zealand 1990 Commemoration Medal. In 1993, he was one of the first two recipients of an honorary Doctor of Science degree from Lincoln University. Hurst received the inaugural J.R. Cocks Memorial Award for outstanding leadership in irrigation from Irrigation New Zealand in 2008.

References

1918 births
2016 deaths
People from Oamaru
People educated at Waitaki Boys' High School
New Zealand military personnel of World War II
Royal New Zealand Air Force personnel
New Zealand farmers
Officers of the Order of the British Empire
Academic staff of the Lincoln University (New Zealand)